Batrachedra lygropis is a species of moth of the family Batrachedridae. It was described by Gottlieb August Wilhelm Herrich-Schäffer in 1853 and is found in Australia.

External links
Australian Faunal Directory

Batrachedridae
Moths of Australia
Moths described in 1853
Taxa named by Gottlieb August Wilhelm Herrich-Schäffer